Skylum (formerly Macphun) is a software developing company based in Bellevue, Washington. It is most known for its photo editing software Aurora HDR and Luminar. Skylum is also the developer of Snapheal, Focus, Tonality, Intensify, Noiseless and FX Photo Studio.

Founded as Macphun in 2008, the company decided to change its name to Skylum in 2017, following the decision to develop its Mac only software for Windows as well.

History 
Skylum was founded as Macphun in 2008 by two gaming developers and amateur photographers, Dmitry Sytnik and Paul Muzok. Initially the company developed applications for iOS. One of its first applications was Vintage Video Maker, which was later named Vintagio. In 2009, Apple named Vintagio among Best iPhone apps of the year. Alex Tsepko, Ivan Kutanin & Oksana Milczarek joined the team few years later. In total, the company released over 60 applications in the first three years. However, it saw the greatest number of downloads in the photography applications. Skylum thus decided to develop the same photography applications for macOS.

In early 2010, Skylum launched its first macOS application, FX Photo Studio Pro, which was earlier available for iOS only. Several other applications were also developed for macOS including Snapheal.

In order to tap the North Americas, the company moved its headquarters to San Diego, United States in 2013. A great number of employees came from the Nik Collection, which was earlier acquired by Google. Later that year, the company launched Intensify, a fully featured photo editing software, that was named among 2013 Best Mac App Store apps. In 2014, Skylum launched Tonality, a black-and-white photo editor software, that won Apple’s Editors’ Choice of the year. The same year, Skylum hired a team in Europe to develop localized versions of its software and start European expansion.

In 2015, Skylum released a new image noise reduction application called Noiseless. Same year Skylum partnered with Trey Ratcliff to develop an HDR program. Through the collaboration Aurora HDR, a High Dynamic Range editing and processing tool, was released in November. A year later, Skylum developed Luminar, an all-in-one photo editing software as an alternative to Adobe’s Lightroom. Both the software became the most known applications by the company. 

In 2017, the company released Aurora HDR and Luminar for Windows - software that previously was available for macOS only. At the same time, it was also announced that Macphun would change its name to Skylum.

Luminar Neo, a more advanced and feature rich modular version of Luminar was released in early 2022 including support for layers, AI masking, extensions and more.

Products 
Skylum is most known for its photo editing software, Aurora HDR launched in 2015, and Luminar launched in 2016. Other notable software by the company include: Snapheal, Focus, Tonality, Intensify, Noiseless, FX Photo Studio, and Photolemur.

Skylum products have been recognized with multiple awards. In 2019, Skylum took home four gold awards at the Digital Camera Grand Prix. The company was honored for innovation in the photo editing sphere with its Luminar 4, Aurora HDR 2019, and Photolemur editing software. Skylum also took home a technical award for its innovative approach. In 2017 Luminar and in 2019 Luminar Flex was named the Best Software Plugin in the Lucie Technical Awards. In the same years, Luminar was awarded the Best Imaging Software by TIPA. In 2018, Luminar was named an Editor’s Pick by Outdoor Photographer.

References

Photo software